Ma Shi Chau (literally "Horse Dung Island") is an island of Hong Kong, under the administration of Tai Po District. It is located in Tolo Harbour in the northeast New Territories (near Sam Mun Tsai). It is connected with another island, Yim Tin Tsai, by a tombolo traversable at low tide.

Geography
Ma Shi Chau has an area of 0.61 km2. It is part of the Ma Shi Chau Special Area, as it exhibits tombolo and tide features rarely seen in Hong Kong. It is the largest island of the four in the Special Area, the others being Yeung Chau, Centre Island and an unnamed island near Yim Tin Tsai.

It has sedimentary rock dating back to the Permian period that is protected by its Special Area status.

See also

Tidal island

References

External links
Ma Shi Chau - Travel Blog

Uninhabited islands of Hong Kong
Tai Po District
Tidal islands
Hong Kong UNESCO Global Geopark
Tombolos
Islands of Hong Kong